Gravitcornutia artificiosa is a species of moth of the family Tortricidae. It is found in Brazil in the Federal District and the states of Rio de Janeiro, São Paulo and Minas Gerais.

References

Moths described in 2001
Gravitcornutia
Moths of South America
Taxa named by Józef Razowski